Janette Cecile Brand-Miller  (born 1952), also known as Jennie Brand-Miller, Janette Cecile Brand and GI Jennie, is an Australian academic who holds a chair in human nutrition in the School of Life and Environmental Sciences at the University of Sydney. She is best known for her research and publications on the glycemic index, a term originated by David J. Jenkins of the University of Toronto, and its role in human health.

Research interests
Her research interests focus on all aspects of carbohydrates—diet and diabetes, the glycemic index of foods, insulin resistance, lactose intolerance and oligosaccharides in infant nutrition.

Brand-Miller holds a special interest in evolutionary nutrition and the diet of Australian Aborigines. As a nutrition lecturer in 1981, she was investigating Aboriginal bushfood when she came across the glycemic index, a nutritional concept devised by David J. Jenkins and colleagues from the University of Toronto. The glycemic index has since changed the way the world thinks about food, nutrition and dieting.

Publications
Brand-Miller has played a major role in educating the community on the glycemic index. Her books about the low GI diet, including The New Glucose Revolution, have sold more than two million copies since 1996. The most recent title in the series, The Low GI Diet, was published in September 2004. She has published 16 books and 200 journal articles.

The Australian paradox: added sugar consumption
She has come under attack by economist Rory Robertson over her argument that added sugar consumption in Australia has declined in recent decades at the same time rates of obesity increased, which she has dubbed the Australian paradox. Recent research by GreenPool Commodity Specialists for the Australian Sugar Refiners, using Australian Bureau of Statistics (ABS "extended series") methodology, has confirmed that apparent consumption of sugar has decreased in Australia over the past few decades. It is worth noting that the ABS is now looking into re-establishing the collection of Apparent Consumption data for Australia. In addition to this, new research by Levy and Shrapnel has confirmed that added sugar from soft drinks has continued to decline, and finally the Australian Governments latest Health Survey indicates that total sugar consumption has decreased from 1995 - 2011/12.

Following an investigation prompted by the Australian economist, two minor arithmetical errors were identified in the original manuscript of The Australian Paradox which were promptly corrected in early 2014. This was the only allegation out of 8 others that was substantiated. Similarly, complaints about the scientific journal Nutrients publication of The Australian Paradox paper were not substantiated.

Awards and recognition
2003: Received a Clunies Ross Medal for Science and Technology
2004: Received the Australian Institute of Food Science and Technology Award of Merit
2009: Received the Sir Kempson Maddox Award for her significant contribution to the diabetes movement and towards helping to improve the lives of people living with diabetes 
2011: Appointed as a Member of the Order of Australia (AM), for her research into human nutrition and as a supporter of people with a hearing impairment.
2018: Elected Fellow of the Australian Academy of Science (FAA).
2022: Upgraded to Officer of the Order of Australia in the 2022 Queen's Birthday Honours for "distinguished service to science, notably in the field of human nutrition, and as an advocate for people with disability".

References

External links 
 International Glycemic Index Database
 GI News - latest updates of GI News and articles from the pioneers of Low GI Diet

1952 births
Australian non-fiction writers
Australian women scientists
Living people
Women nutritionists
Fellows of the Australian Academy of Science
Officers of the Order of Australia